The Kanab ambersnail, scientific name Oxyloma haydeni kanabense or Oxyloma kanabense, is a critically endangered subspecies or species of small, air-breathing land snail, a terrestrial pulmonate gastropod mollusc in the family Succineidae, the amber snails. The common name of the amber snails is based on the shell, which is translucent and when empty usually resembles the color of amber.

This species is endemic to the United States, specifically the states of Arizona and Utah, where it was first collected in the early 20th century. This snail lives in wetlands, springs, and seeps, and only two of its natural habitats are known to exist: Three Lakes, a meadow near Kanab, Utah, and Vasey's Paradise, a springs along the Colorado River within Grand Canyon National Park. In its natural habitat it is rather polyphagous, feeding mainly on bacteria, plants and fungi. It reproduces during the summer.

Now considered a critically endangered species on the IUCN Red List of Threatened Species due to a series of factors (including anthropic influence), the Kanab ambersnail has been reintroduced to three springs above the historic high water level along the Colorado River.

The snail had been listed as endangered on the United States Fish and Wildlife Service list of endangered species in 1991. In June 2021, the Fish and Wildlife Service removed the Kanab ambersnail from the federal endangered species list after genetic testing demonstrated it had never been a distinct subspecies.

Taxonomy

These specimens were originally thought to belong to the species Succinea hawkinsi.

Pilsbry (1948) transferred these specimens to the genus Oxyloma and erected the subspecies kanabensis in the species haydeni for them. Arthur Clarke (1991) notes that Pilsbry’s decision to accord the Kanab ambersnail subspecific status was
preliminary, and that, as Pilsbry himself noted, “its taxonomic status should be reevaluated.”

Clarke (1991) and Shei K. Wu (Colorado Museum of Natural History, Boulder, Colorado, pers. comm. 1992, 1995) suggest that the Kanab ambersnail may deserve full species status. Earle Spamer (Academy of Natural Sciences of Philadelphia, Philadelphia, Pennsylvania, pers. comm. 1994) stated that although current published mollusk checklists (Turgeon et al. 1988 and Groombridge 1993) treat the Kanab ambersnail at species level rather that as a subspecies, nonetheless, until the criteria are derived (and published) by which the taxon can be known to be a separate species, it should continue to be called by its original name, the one published by Pilsbry (1948): Oxyloma haydeni spp. kanabensis. Despite this, NatureServe does list this taxon as a species.

Description
The Kanab ambersnail is a terrestrial snail in the family Succineidae. The empty shell is a light amber color. The live snail has a mottled grayish-amber to yellowish-amber colored shell. The shell is dextral (right-handed spiral), thin-walled, with an elevated spire and a Daly, patulous (expanded) aperture. Fully mature individuals are about 14 to 19 mm (0.5 to 0.75 inch) long, 7 to 9 mm (0.25 to 0.33 inch) in diameter, with 3.25 to 3.75 whorls in a drawn out spire.

Its eyes are borne at the ends of long peduncles (stalks), while the tentacles are reduced to small protuberances at the base of the eye stalks.

Ecology
The natural predators of this snail are passerines, such as the (American robin), and deer mice.

Habitat
In 1996, 16% of the ambersnail's habitat at Vasey's Paradise was destroyed in a flood, and a more disastrous previous flood in 1994 had probably already threatened the snail's habitat. The suitable area for habitat in Three Lakes is believed to extend to an area 1.3 km long, and 90 m wide, and genetic diversity seems to indicate that the area is more stable than Vasey's Paradise. However their redistribution is also affected by the presence of their host plants and rock ledges.

Three Lakes, a privately owned wet meadow near Kanab, is one of only two natural habitats for the Kanab ambersnail. The snail's habitat is threatened by commercial development by the owner of Three Lakes,  Best Friends Animal Society.

Despite being air-breathing molluscs, they can survive for up to 32 hours in cold, highly oxygenated water, which may have helped to disperse its population around the Colorado Valley area since a controlled release was conducted in 1998.

Feeding habits
The Kanab ambersnail is typically found on host plants, primarily the scarlet monkeyflower (Erythranthe cardinalis) and watercress (Nasturtium officinale), but also sedges and rushes. It feeds on plant tissue, fungi, algae, and bacteria, using its radula to scrape off food.

Life cycle
Like all pulmonate land snails, ambersnails are hermaphroditic, having both male and female reproductive systems, and are believed to be capable of self-fertilization. In the wild they live for between 12 and 15 months. Young snails enter dormancy between October and November, becoming active again in March and April. Mature snails reproduce in the summer months.

Population
Only two wild populations of the snail are known to exist, specifically, Three Lakes near Kanab, Utah and Vasey's Paradise. The latter was not discovered until 1991 when a survey of mollusks in the area was conducted. There was formerly a third population present in Kanab, Utah, but it is believed to have become extirpated through the destruction of its habitat.

Conservation
In November 1991, Kanab ambersnail was proposed for emergency listing by the United States Fish and Wildlife Service. The Kanab ambersnail had been included United States Fish and Wildlife Service list of endangered mammals and birds since April 1992.

The Kanab ambersnail is evaluated as Critically Endangered on the IUCN Red List of Threatened Species.

Reintroduction releases have been conducted at three sites along the Colorado river, each releasing 150 snails. The first of these releases was conducted in September 1998, and all sites were sufficiently high enough to not be flooded by normal dam activity. A second release was conducted at the same three sites in July 1999 to boost population densities and improve genetic variability, but only one of the three sites, Upper Elves Chasm, has established a new population.

In Utah, its habitat was threatened by commercial development, whereas the Grand Canyon population is threatened by discharges from the Glen Canyon Dam which can sweep the snail and its habitat downstream.

Delisting
In 2013, a scientific investigations report by the United States Geological Survey concluded that the Kanab ambersnail is not a genetically distinct species. In January 2020, the Fish and Wildlife Service published a proposed rule removing the Kanab ambersnail from the Federal List of Endangered Species due to "taxonomic error". In June 2021, the FWS finalized the removal of the Kanab ambersnail from the endangered species list because it is not a district subspecies.

References
This article incorporates public domain text (a public domain work of the United States Government) from the reference.

External links
 Species profile of Kanab ambersnail (Oxyloma haydeni kanabensis) at U.S. Fish & Wildlife Service webpage
 
 https://web.archive.org/web/20061004020108/http://www.gf.state.az.us/w_c/nongame_kanab_ambersnail.shtml
 
 1991. Endangered and Threatened Wildlife and Plants; Emergency Rule to List the Kanab Ambersnail as Endangered / RIN 1018-AB67. United States Fish and Wildlife Service.

Molluscs of the United States
Succineidae
Kanab, Utah
Gastropods described in 1948
ESA endangered species
Subspecies